Bruce MacPherson may refer to:

 Bruce MacPherson (field hockey) (born 1958), field hockey player from Canada
 Bruce MacPherson (judge) (1891–1971), Second Deemster in the Isle of Man
 D. Bruce MacPherson, Episcopal bishop